The JRA Cup (Japan Racing Association) is a Moonee Valley Racing Club Group 3 Thoroughbred quality handicap horse race, over a distance of 2040 metres, held annually at Moonee Valley Racecourse, Melbourne, Australia in September. The total prize money is A$200,000.

History
As an unlisted race the race was known as the Geoff Madden Handicap.

Grade
 Prior 1996 - Unlisted Race
1996–2009 - Listed Race
 2010 onwards - Group 3

Winners

 2020 - Al Galayel
 2019 - Captain Cook
 2018 - The Taj Mahal
 2017 - Jon Snow
 2016 - Real Love
 2015 - Escado
 2014 - The Cleaner
 2013 - Mourinho
 2012 - Bianmick
 2011 - Dream Pedlar
 2010 - Precedence
 2009 - Alcopop
 2008 - Cefalu
 2007 - Maldivian
 2006 - Pavlova
 2005 - El Segundo
 2004 - Beswinging
 2003 - General Booth
 2002 - Cheverny
 2001 - Rain Gauge
 2000 - Prince Benbara
 1999 - Brave Chief
 1998 - Il Don
 1997 - Sunny Lane
 1996 - Section

See also
 List of Australian Group races
 Group races

References

Horse races in Australia